Massimeno is a comune (municipality) in Trentino in the northern Italian region Trentino-Alto Adige/Südtirol, located about  northwest of Trento.

Massimeno borders the following municipalities: Giustino, Spiazzo, Strembo, Caderzone, Daone, Bocenago, Pelugo and Comano Terme.

Demographic evolution

References

Cities and towns in Trentino-Alto Adige/Südtirol